Qsquare is a shopping mall in Datong District, Taipei, Taiwan.

History
The shopping mall was opened on 11 December 2009. On 19 April 2021, a fire broke out at the shopping mall and 202 visitors were evacuated.

Transportation
The shopping mall is accessible within walking distance north of Taipei Main Station. The shopping mall building also houses the Taipei Bus Station.

See also
 List of tourist attractions in Taiwan

References

External links

  

2009 establishments in Taiwan
Shopping malls in Taipei